"Never Give Up" is a song recorded by Sia, from the soundtrack of the Garth Davis-directed film, Lion (2016). Written by Sia and her producer Greg Kurstin, the song was released on 18 November 2016. It was nominated for a Grammy Award for Best Song Written For Visual Media. It is an electropop ballad, with influences of Indian Music.

Critical reception
Jon Blistein from Rolling Stone called it an "inspirational anthem." Sam Murphy from Music Feeds said, "Sia taps into the Indian roots of the film by delivering a Bollywood vibe beneath her characteristically sunny undertones." Lars Brandle in Billboard described it as a "powerful and uplifting" number. The song was nominated for a Grammy Award for Best Song Written for Visual Media.

Lyric video
An accompanying lyric video was released on 3 January 2017. Inspired by the plot of the film, the clip follows a child and an older child with their faces shrouded, wearing half-blonde and -black Sia wigs, searching for each other in a deserted and ominous train station. As the video progresses, the kids reunite, scale a steely locomotive and follow the tracks out of the station and into the night. The song's lyrics appear spray-painted on various surfaces in the yard. Reviewing the clip, Vibe staff wrote that the singer "envisioned a journey of hope and faith between two conjoined souls in the visual experience."

Credits 
Adapted from Lion (Original Motion Picture Soundtrack) album liner.

Chris Allgood – assistant mastering
Julian Burg – engineer
Sia Furler – lead and background vocals
Alex Pasco – engineer
Greg Kurstin – mixing, engineer, producer, tambura [tanpura], keyboards, drums, programming, percussion
Emily Lazar – mastering

Charts

Weekly charts

Year-end charts

Certifications

References

External links

2016 singles
2016 songs
Sia (musician) songs
Song recordings produced by Greg Kurstin
Songs about suicide
Songs written by Sia (musician)
Songs written by Greg Kurstin
Songs written for films